Harbingers are fictional comic book superhuman beings who appear in books published by Valiant Comics. Two different groups of Harbingers appeared in the comic book series Harbinger.

History 
When Solar recreated the world that became known as the Valiant Universe, a number of super-powered beings emerged. The most notable of those were Harbingers, human beings with a wide range of psionic powers. Throughout history, their powers tended to lie dormant, emerging in occasional bursts that were usually brought on by stress. That changed when Toyo Harada, a Japanese-born Harbinger, established the Harbinger Foundation. He hoped to study the Harbingers and the full extent of their powers. He discovered that he was what he dubbed an Omega Harbinger, a Harbinger who possessed a full range of Harbinger potential, and could activate the latent powers of other Harbingers. Harada decided to use his powers and resources to change the world for the better, no matter the cost. He began recruiting other Harbingers and creating programs to teach them how to  better use their powers. The most skilled recruits became Eggbreakers, Harada's elite enforcers charged with containing renegade Harbingers, among other things.

In the early 1990s, the Harbinger Foundation discovered the existence of Peter Stanchek, the only other Omega Harbinger that existed at the time. Harada hoped that he would become a valuable ally. However, Pete discovered the truth behind Harada's ultimate plan after his close friend, who was outspoken against the Harbinger Foundation and their methods, was murdered by Harada's assassins and an attempt was made to kill Pete Stanchek as well. Stanchek fled the Foundation, taking his girlfriend with him, and decided to stop the Harbinger Foundation from reaching its goals. To that end, they recruited other Harbingers, and undermined Harada's plans in any way they could.

List of Harbingers

Harbinger Resistance
 Charlene Dupre (Flamingo), a pyrokinetic
 Peter Stanchek (Sting), untrained "Omega Harbinger" with a range of powers
 John Torkelson (Torque), super-strength & durability
 Faith "Zeppelin" Herbert (Zephyr), self-levitation
 Kris Hathaway, the only non-powered member of the resistance; Peter's girlfriend

Harbinger Foundation 
 Puff
 Eel
 Toyo Harada
 Lump
 Rock
 Thumper
 Sparrow
 Weasel
 Blast
 Swallow
 Warp
 Flashbulb
 Tse-tse
 Ghost
 Taser
 Gridlock
 Mak

(formerly)
 Stronghold
 Livewire

Unaffiliated Harbingers 

Ax - an unstable Harbinger with the power similar to that of Geomancers, except in his case, it only extends to technological devices. It is also quite similar to The abilities displayed by Bloodshot and XO Manowar to communicate with and control technology. He is introduced in issue 3 of Harbinger when he is recruited by the team to break into Harada's protected files. Although they sense his moral ambiguity, Sting activated his Harbinger power. After a disastrous caper on the dark side of the moon, the team learn that Ax cannot be trusted and Sting considers taking his powers away. Ultimately they decide to leave him with his powers, though they understood the risk he posed. Ax then embarked on a life of crime, which brought him into conflict with both Bloodshot and XO Manowar. Although he wasn't able to steal their technology, Ax's powers continued to grow and he found himself in a race with Harada to acquire the "blood of heroes" (the nanites in Bloodshot's blood). Ax killed Bloodshot on a moonbase in 2028. His time with the blood of heroes was short, but he copied his personality into a hidden computer file within the nanites before being killed by Harada's troops. The file lay hidden for centuries before being accidentally opened by Rai in the distant future. Ax struggled to gain control of the body but is eventually trapped in a virtual reality world where he reins as supreme ruler.

Obadiah Archer (Archer) - a Harbinger with hyper-perception and enhanced coordination and reflexes. He is frequently partnered with the immortal Armstrong. In the future, he wound up marrying Flamingo. He founded a spiritual movement known as Archies which endured into the 41st century.

Angelo Mortalli (Bloodshot) - Although it was the nanotech enhancements given to him as part of Project Rising Spirit that granted him most of his superhuman abilities (super strength, speed, coordination, healing), the hero known as "Bloodshot" also had the innate Harbinger ability to communicate with and control machines. 

 Eugene Mutholland (Bazooka)
 Frank C. Treese (Fort)
 Donald W. Tietz (Spikeman)

External links
Harbingers Info at International Catelogue of Superheroes

Valiant Comics characters
Valiant Comics superheroes
Characters created by Jim Shooter